Daranganeh (also Romanized as Darangāneh; also known as Dalangūneh, Delengāneh, and Delengūneh) is a village in Nasrovan Rural District, in the Central District of Darab County, Fars Province, Iran. At the 2006 census, its population was 772, in 158 families.

References 

Populated places in Darab County